Farooq (also transliterated as Farouk, Faruqi, Farook, Faruk, Faroeq, Faruq, or Farouq, Farooqi, Faruque or Farooqui) is a common Arabic given and family name. Al-Fārūq literally means "the one who distinguishes between right and wrong."

Given name

Farouk
Farouk of Egypt (1920–1965), King of Egypt and the Sudan
Farouk El-Baz (born 1938), scientist
Farouk Hosny (born 1938), painter
Farouk Janeman (1953–2013), Fijian athlete
Farouk Kaddoumi (born 1931), Palestinian leader
Farouk Kamoun (born 1946), Tunisian scientist
Farouk Lawan (born 1962), Nigerian politician
Farouk Seif Al Nasr (1922–2009), Egyptian politician 
Farouk Shami, Palestinian-American businessman
Farouk al-Sharaa (born 1938), Syrian politician

Farooq

Farooq Abdullah (born 1937), Indian politician
Farooq Kathwari, United States businessman
Farooq Kperogi, Nigerian academic
Farooq Leghari (1940–2010), eighth President of Pakistan from November 14, 1993 until December 2, 1997
Farooq Naek (born 1950), Pakistani lawyer
Farooq Sheikh (1948–2013), Indian actor
Farooq Shah (born 1985), Pakistani footballer
Faarooq, ring name of professional wrestler Ron Simmons (born 1958)
Farooque (born 1948), Bangladeshi actor

Farooqi
Muhammed Sharif al-Faruqi Responsible for initiating Arab revolt from the Ottomans.

Faruk
Faruk Cömert (born 1946), Turkish military officer
Faruk Çelik (born 1956), Turkish politician
Faruk Gül, Turkish and American economist and academic
Faruk Sükan (1921–2005), Turkish physician and politician
Faruk Süren (born 1945), Turkish businessman 
Faruk Türünz (born 1944), Turkish luthier
Faruk Yiğit (born 1968), Turkish footballer

Surname

Farouk
Bakhtier Farouk, engineer and published author
El Amry Farouk, Egyptian businessman and politician
Nabil Farouk (1956–2020), Egyptian novelist

Farook
Hunais Farook (born 1973), a Sri Lankan politician
Syed Rizwan Farook (1987–2015), a perpetrator of the 2015 San Bernardino attack

Farooq
Mohammad Farooq or Muhammad Farooq, several people
Mohammad Farooq (cricketer, born 1938), Pakistani cricketer
Muhammad Farooq Khan (1956–2010), Pakistani psychiatrist
Muhammad Farooq (journalist) (fl. 1991–2006), Pakistani journalist and Naat Khawan
Mir Waiz Umar Farooq, Kashmiri separatist leader.

See also
Al-Farooq (disambiguation)
Farook College, Calicut

Arabic-language surnames
Arabic masculine given names
Turkish masculine given names